Isabella Riva (22 April 1887 - 10 August 1985) was an Italian actress.

Born in Nizza Monferrato, Asti as Isabella Trufarelli, daughter of actors, Riva began acting as a child in the stage company ran by her grandparents.  After working in several companies, in 1919 she became main actress of the Alfredo Sainati stage company.   She was also a film and television actress.

Riva retired in 1968, moving to Bologna in the retirement home for actors "Lyda Borelli" where she continued to teach acting for several years.

Selected filmography
 Snow White and the Seven Thieves (1949)
 The Mill on the Po (1949) 
 The Angel of the Alps (1957)

References

External links 
 

Italian film actresses
1887 births
People from Nizza Monferrato
Italian stage actresses
1985 deaths
Italian television actresses
20th-century Italian actresses